Charlie Rosen (born July 20, 1990) is an American musician, composer, arranger, orchestrator, musical director, and music producer. He is best known for his work on Broadway, where he has worked on Be More Chill, Prince of Broadway, and American Psycho. He is also the leader of The 8-Bit Big Band, a jazz orchestra specializing in video game music.

Early life 
Rosen was born in Los Angeles, California as the son of a bassoonist and organist. He was taught piano by his mother starting from the age of three. At the age of fifteen, he joined the onstage band for the Los Angeles production of 13. He moved to New York at the age of seventeen to make his Broadway debut in 13, where he was a swing. He later attended Berklee College of Music for four semesters.

Career 
Rosen began his professional career as a swing musician for the bass, guitar, and percussion tracks of 13. Starting in 2012, he was the bandleader of Charlie Rosen's Broadway Big Band, where he arranged classic musical theater numbers into music that could be performed by a jazz orchestra with Broadway performers as the vocalists. , he primarily features as a guitarist in the Broadway musical Be More Chill.

Rosen can play about 70 musical instruments including the "flugelbone", melodica, Fender Rhodes, and theremin. Of these he has described the flugelbone as his "orchestrating secret weapon" due to its ability to utilize variety of timbres. However, he considers himself primarily a bassist but uses the range of instruments in his repertoire to improve the quality of the music he is able to create.

Rosen is also the composer on 2021 comedy film Here Today.

The 8-Bit Big Band
In 2017 Rosen founded The 8-Bit Big Band as a jazz and pops orchestra, featuring from 26 to 65 musicians who cover video game songs from franchises such as Super Mario Brothers, Legend of Zelda, Final Fantasy, and Pokémon. The band has a presence on YouTube with over 142,000 subscribers and 13,000,000 total views as of March 2021. In May 2018, the 8-Bit Big Band released its first album entitled Press Start! In June 2019, the band released its second album Choose Your Character which covers music from Donkey Kong Country, Duck Tales, Sonic The Hedgehog, Pokémon, Portal, and more. In November 2021, the band's cover of "Meta Knight's Revenge" from Kirby Super Star won a Grammy Award for Best Arrangement, Instrumental or A Cappella.

Credits

Theater

Film

Awards and nominations

References 

Living people
1990 births
Berklee College of Music alumni
Guitarists from Los Angeles
People from Harlem
21st-century American composers
American music arrangers
Guitarists from New York City
Songwriters from New York (state)
Songwriters from California
Broadway music directors
Video game musicians
American double-bassists
American musical theatre composers
21st-century American male musicians
Jazz music arrangers
American male songwriters
Grammy Award winners
Tony Award winners